David McAllister (born 1971) is a German politician and former Prime Minister of Lower Saxony.

David McAllister may also refer to:

 David McAllister (dancer) (born 1963), artistic director of The Australian Ballet
 David McAllister (footballer) (born 1988), Irish association footballer for Stevenage

See also
 David McAlister (1951–2015), British actor in The Stones of Blood
 David McAllester (disambiguation)